

Buildings and structures

Buildings

 1280
 The Piazza del Campo at Siena, Italy is begun (completed in 1350).
 Durham Cathedral (in Durham, England) is completed (begun in 1093).
 The second Doorwerth Castle, rebuilt of stone, on the Rhine near Arnhem, is again besieged, and this time the bailey is burned down.
 At the site of present-day Sheffield Cathedral in England, a second parish church is completed, but is mostly demolished and rebuilt about 1430 on a cruciform floor plan.
 Spire of St Wulfram's Church, Grantham, England, is begun.
 Cressing Temple Wheat Barn in eastern England erected by about this date.
 1281 – The Basilica de Sant Francesc is built in Palma, Majorca, on a site where the Moors made soap.
 1282
 In Naples, Italy, original construction of Castel Nuovo (Italian: "New Castle") is completed (begun in 1279); it has been expanded or renovated several times since.
 Albi Cathedral in Languedoc is begun.
 1283 – Construction of Caernarfon, Conwy and Harlech Castles in Gwynedd, North Wales, is begun by King Edward I of England.
 1284 – Construction of Beauvais Cathedral is interrupted by a partial collapse of the choir.
 1285 – Regensburg Cathedral is redesigned in Gothic style.
 1289
 Construction of Conwy Castle, ordered by King Edward I of England, is completed in North Wales.
 Construction of the Belaya Vezha tower in Belarus is completed.
 Dedication of Santa Maria di Collemaggio on the edge of L'Aquila.
 Pope Nicholas IV formally constitutes the University of Montpellier in France by papal bull, combining various existing schools under the mantle of a single university.

Births
 c. 1285 – Agostino da Siena, Italian architect and sculptor (died c. 1347)

Deaths

References

Architecture